In Monotheism, Divine unity is God's attribute of Oneness and may refer to:
 Unitarianism, the belief that God is one person.
 the nature of God in Oneness Pentecostalism.
 "oneness of God" (tawhid), an Islamic doctrine the rejecting the Trinity
 the oneness of God, one of the three core assertions of the Baháʼí teachings#Unity
 Divine simplicity, the belief that God is without distinguishable parts, characteristics or features (is "one").